Greatest Hits is a compilation album by English singer Morrissey, released on 11 February 2008. Unlike 1997's greatest hits, Suedehead: The Best of Morrissey, this compilation predominantly features songs from the then previous two studio albums, You Are the Quarry and Ringleader of the Tormentors. The album also features two new songs, lead single "That's How People Grow Up" and "All You Need Is Me", both of which were later included on studio album Years of Refusal.

Track listing

Bonus live CD
Initial runs of the album were accompanied by a bonus CD of songs recorded live at the Hollywood Bowl on June 8th, 2007. The international version features eight tracks, whereas the US version features "That's How People Grow Up" (written by Morrissey and Boorer, 3:05) as track 8, pushing "Life is a Pigsty" to track 9.  All songs written by Morrissey and Alain Whyte, unless indicated otherwise.

Track listing:
"The Last of the Famous International Playboys" (Morrissey, Street) (3:51)
"The National Front Disco" (4:08)
"Let Me Kiss You" (4:28)
"Irish Blood, English Heart" (2:42)
"I Will See You in Far-Off Places" (4:16)
"First of the Gang to Die" (4:23)
"I Just Want to See the Boy Happy" (Morrissey, Tobias) (3:20)
"Life is a Pigsty" (9:15)

Etchings

Given that the CD is a mock up of a vinyl record, the words WE ARE YOUR THOUGHTS appear on the runout grooves.

References

Morrissey compilation albums
2008 greatest hits albums
Albums produced by Steve Lillywhite
Albums produced by Tony Visconti
Albums produced by Stephen Street
Albums produced by Jerry Finn
Polydor Records compilation albums
Decca Records compilation albums